The Paine House is a historic house in Xenia, Illinois, which was the home of author Albert Bigelow Paine. Built in 1858, the house was designed using elements of the Greek Revival and Gothic Revival styles. Paine lived in the house from 1873 to 1888; during this time, he began his writing career, authoring several stories and poems. Several of Paine's works were published in Xenia's local newspapers, which inspired him to pursue his career. Paine later became known for his close friendship with Mark Twain; Paine edited Twain's letters and wrote a multi-volume biography of the author. As of the 1980s, the house was still owned and occupied by the descendants of Paine's family.

The house was added to the National Register of Historic Places on November 14, 1985.

References

Houses on the National Register of Historic Places in Illinois
Greek Revival houses in Illinois
Gothic Revival architecture in Illinois
Houses completed in 1858
Houses in Clay County, Illinois
National Register of Historic Places in Clay County, Illinois
1858 establishments in Illinois